Travna Gora is a settlement in the hills south of Sodražica in southern Slovenia. It no longer has any permanent residents, but a number of small vacation houses are regularly used. The area is part of the traditional region of Lower Carniola and is now included in the Southeast Slovenia Statistical Region.

History
Travna Gora was administratively separated from Ravni Dol in 1998 and made an independent settlement.

References

External links
Travna Gora on Geopedia

Populated places in the Municipality of Sodražica